The 1970–71 CHL season was the eighth season of the Central Hockey League, a North American minor professional league. Seven teams participated in the regular season, and the Omaha Knights won the league title.

Regular season

Playoffs

External links
 Statistics on hockeydb.com

CPHL
Central Professional Hockey League seasons